The AARP Movies for Grownups Award for Best Supporting Actress is one of the AARP Movies for Grownups Awards presented annually by the AARP. The award honors an actress over the age of 50 who has given an outstanding supporting performance in a film in a given year. The awards for Supporting Actress and Supporting Actor were first given at the 7th AARP Movies for Grownups Awards in 2008. Prior to that, the only individual acting awards were for Best Actor and Best Actress.

Winners and Nominees

2000s

2010s

2020s

Actors with multiple nominations

The following individuals received multiple Best Supporting Actress nominations:

Age superlatives

See also
 Academy Award for Best Supporting Actress
 BAFTA Award for Best Actress in a Supporting Role
 Broadcast Film Critics Association Award for Best Supporting Actress
 Golden Globe Award for Best Supporting Actress – Motion Picture
 Independent Spirit Award for Best Supporting Female
 Screen Actors Guild Award for Outstanding Performance by a Female Actor in a Supporting Role

References

Film awards for supporting actress
Supporting Actress